Duke's Hollow is a 0.27 hectare Local Nature Reserve and Site of Metropolitan Importance for Nature Conservation in Chiswick in the London Borough of Hounslow. It is owned and managed by Hounslow Council.

The reserve is a steeply sloping site down towards the River Thames east of Barnes Railway Bridge, with access from Dan Mason Drive.

See also 
 Dukes Meadows Footbridge

References

Nature reserves in the London Borough of Hounslow
Local nature reserves in Greater London
Chiswick